Patrick Schmidt may refer to:

 Patrick Schmidt (footballer, born 1988), German footballer
 Patrick Schmidt (footballer, born 1993), German footballer
 Patrick Schmidt (footballer, born 1998), Austrian footballer
 Patrick Schmidt (field hockey), Austrian field hockey player

See also
Patrick Schmit (born 1974), Luxembourgish figure skater